Anat Maimoni (born 5 February 1982) is an Israeli football midfielder.

Club career
Maimoni had played in the Israeli First League since its inception in 1998 with ASA Tel Aviv University, winning 5 championship titles and 2 national cups with the club, as well as playing in the UEFA Women's Champions League.

International career
Maimoni played for the national team between 2000 and 2008, appearing in 26 matches.

Honours
Championships (5):
With ASA Tel Aviv University: 1999–2000, 2009–10, 2010–11 , 2011–12 , 2012–13
Cup (2):
With ASA Tel Aviv University: 2010–11, 2011–12

References

External links
 
 

1982 births
Living people
Israeli Jews
Jewish sportspeople
Israeli women's footballers
Israel women's international footballers
ASA Tel Aviv University players
Maccabi Holon F.C. (women) players
Women's association football midfielders
Footballers from Jerusalem